The First National Bank is a historic commercial building located at New Cumberland, Hancock County, West Virginia. The building has also been known as the Graham Building and the Ross Building. It was built in 1903, and is a two-story, four bay blond brick building with an elevated basement. It features an elevated recessed corner entry with a Doric order column at the corner. It was originally occupied by the First National Bank, until it failed in 1927. For 61 years, from 1929 to 1990, the first floor space housed Graham's Department Store.

The building was listed on the National Register of Historic Places in 2000.

References

Bank buildings on the National Register of Historic Places in West Virginia
Commercial buildings completed in 1903
Buildings and structures in Hancock County, West Virginia
Buildings designated early commercial in the National Register of Historic Places in West Virginia
National Register of Historic Places in Hancock County, West Virginia
Commercial buildings on the National Register of Historic Places in West Virginia